Bryant Township may refer to:
 Bryant Township, Graham County, Kansas
 Bryant Township, Fillmore County, Nebraska
 Bryant Township, Logan County, North Dakota

Township name disambiguation pages